The Church of St Michael and All Saints is an Episcopal parish church in Edinburgh, Scotland. The church stands in the Anglo-Catholic tradition, and is a Category A listed building.

History
Having been designed by Sir Robert Rowand Anderson, the main part of the church was built from 1866 to 1867. The west end was built from 1866 to 1867, and a Lady Chapel was added in 1897.

On 14 December 1970, the church was designated a category A listed building, signifying a building of national or international importance.

The church has hosted concerts and masses as part of the Edinburgh Festival Fringe, the world's largest arts festival.

Notable clergy
Curate
 1913 to 1914: Arnold Spencer-Smith
List of rectors:
 1965 to 1971: Ernest Brady
 1971 to 1984: Gordon Reid
 1984 to 1990: A. Emsley Nimmo
 1990 to 1995: Timothy A. R. Cole
 1995 to 2011: Kevin Pearson
 2011 to 2013: David Charles Standen
 2014 to present: Martin Robson

References

Episcopal church buildings in Edinburgh
Listed churches in Edinburgh
Category A listed buildings in Edinburgh
Anglo-Catholic church buildings in Scotland